The 14th Regiment Illinois Volunteer Infantry was an infantry regiment that served in the Union Army during the American Civil War.

Service
The 14th Illinois Infantry was mustered into Federal service for a three-year enlistment on May 25, 1861, at Jacksonville, Illinois.

The regiment was consolidated with 15th Illinois Infantry on July 1, 1864, as the 14th and 15th Battalion Illinois Volunteer Infantry but reorganized as the 14th Illinois on April 28, 1865.

The regiment was mustered out on September 18, 1865, at Fort Leavenworth, Kansas.

Total strength and casualties
The regiment suffered 62 enlisted soldiers killed in action or mortally wounded and 1 officer and 160 enlisted who died of disease, for a total of 223 fatalities.

Commanders
Colonel John M. Palmer - promoted to brigadier general.
Colonel Cyrus Hall 
Lt.Colonel William Cam(m)

See also
List of Illinois Civil War Units
Illinois in the American Civil War

Notes

References
The Civil War Archive

Units and formations of the Union Army from Illinois
1861 establishments in Illinois
Military units and formations established in 1861
Military units and formations disestablished in 1865